This is a list of German television related events from 1991.

Events
21 March - Atlantis 2000 are selected to represent Germany at the 1991 Eurovision Song Contest with their song "Dieser Traum darf niemals sterben". They are selected to be the thirty-sixth German Eurovision entry during Ein Lied für Rom held at the Friedrichstadt-Palast in Berlin.

Debuts

International
1 January -  Mr. Bean (1990–1995) (SWR Fernsehen)
5 January -  Chip 'n Dale: Rescue Rangers (1989–1990) (Das Erste)
5 January -  Spiff and Hercules (1989–1991) (RTLplus)
7 January - / Beetlejuice (1989–1991) (Sat. 1)
23 February -  The Super Mario Bros. Super Show! (1989) (RTL)
8 June -  Garfield and Friends (1988–1994) (ZDF)
13 September -  The Simpsons (1989–present) (ZDF)
21 December -  The Tom and Jerry Kids Show (1990–1993) (RTLplus)

Armed Forces Network
 Captain Planet and the Planeteers (1990–1996)
/ Widget (1990–1991)
 Tiny Toon Adventures (1990–1992)
/ Bucky O'Hare and the Toad Wars (1991)
 Harry and the Hendersons (1991–1993)
 Clarissa Explains It All (1991–1994)
 The Simpsons (1989–present)

BFBS
15 February -  Five Children and It (1991)
22 February -  Billy Webb's Amazing Stories (1991)
26 June -  Finders Keepers (1991-1996, 2006)
27 June -  The Real McCoy (1991–1996)
28 June -  The Girl from Tomorrow (1990)
16 September -  Victor and Hugo (1991–1992)
4 November -  Time Riders (1991)
5 November - / Rupert (1991–1997)
7 November -  The Legend of Prince Valiant (1991–1993)
16 November -  Watt on Earth (1991–1992)
30 December - / Captain Zed and the Zee Zone (1991–1993)
 Grotbags (1991–1993)
 Forget Me Not Farm (1990–1991)
 Radio Roo (1991–1993)
 Gordon the Gopher (1991)
 Dodgem (1991)

Television shows

1950s
Tagesschau (1952–present)

1960s
 heute (1963-present)

1970s
 heute-journal (1978-present)
 Tagesthemen (1978-present)

1980s
Wetten, dass..? (1981-2014)
Lindenstraße (1985–2020)

Changes of network affiliation

Military broadcasting

Ending this year

Births

Deaths